Best Bits is a New Zealand comedy show, where a panel of comedians comment on video clips taken from television during the week prior. It is produced by The Down Low Concept, and hosted by comedian Te Radar in the first series and ex-Seven Sharp presenter and comedian Jesse Mulligan in the second and third series.

The first series premiered on TV One on 19 July 2013, and ended in October 2013 with "Best Bits of Best Bits", an episode where highlights from the past series were revisited. The second series premiered on 26 March 2014, and ended on 19 June 2014. The third series premiered on 26 February 2015, and ended on 21 May 2015.

Series overview

Format
The show is recorded in front of a live audience. Each week the host, along with a recurring panel of four comedians, share brief video clips taken from television programmes, commercials, and infomercials from both New Zealand and international broadcasters that were broadcast during the past week. The panelists then make observations and jokes (usually of a satirical nature) about what they have seen.

Panelists

Recurring panelists
 Vaughan Smith 
 Rhys Matthewson
 Heidi O'Loughlin
 Matt Heath
 Guy Montgomery
Jackie van Beek
 Donna Brookbanks

Guest panelists
 Rose Matafeo
 Shavaughn Ruakere
 Alexis Dubus (as Marcel Lucont)
 Nick Gibb 
 Sara Pascoe

International adaptations
An Australian version of the format, Best Bits, aired from 29 March 2016 on the Seven Network.

References

External links
 Website

2010s New Zealand television series
2013 New Zealand television series debuts
2015 New Zealand television series endings
New Zealand comedy television series
Television shows filmed in New Zealand
Television shows funded by NZ on Air
TVNZ 1 original programming